The 1996 Speedway World Team Cup was the 37th edition of the FIM Speedway World Team Cup to determine the team world champions.

The final took place on 15 September, at the Diedenbergen stadium in Germany. The Poland team won their seventh title but their first for 27 years having last won the 1969 Speedway World Team Cup.

Qualification

Group C
 June 2, 1996
  Prelog

New Zealand and Finland withdrew

Russia and Croatia to Group B

Group B

 June 30, 1996
  Ljubljana

Russia and Ukraine to Group A

Group A

 August 25
  Piła

Draw.  →  B

Poland and Russia to Final

World Final

 September 15, 1996
  Diedenbergen

See also
 1996 Speedway Grand Prix

References

Speedway World Team Cup
World T